The Royal United Hospitals Bath NHS Foundation Trust runs the Royal United Hospital (RUH), a major acute-care hospital in Bath, England. The trust also runs the Royal National Hospital for Rheumatic Diseases (since 2015) and Sulis Hospital at Peasedown St John (since 2021).

History 
In 2011, the RUH applied to become authorised as an NHS foundation trust from late Spring 2012, however this was postponed after issues were raised by the Care Quality Commission about aspects of patient care. The process was restarted in 2014. It was authorised as a Foundation Trust in October 2014.  
The trust's chief executive is Cara Charles-Barks, who took over in September 2020 on the retirement of James Scott.

RUH redevelopment
In 2008, plans were revealed for a £100million redevelopment of the pre-World War II RUH North buildings, which would include an increase in single-occupancy rooms in line with Government targets. The first stage of this work was originally planned to start in 2012. In 2014, a five-year development plan, incorporating a new cancer centre, was confirmed.

Royal National Hospital for Rheumatic Diseases 
The trust which ran the specialist Royal National Hospital for Rheumatic Diseases was taken over by the RUH Trust in 2015. In 2019 the hospital moved from its historic building in central Bath to a new building adjacent to the main RUH building at Combe Park.

Sulis Hospital 
In 2021 the trust bought the private hospital, Circle Bath, from Circle Health. This gives the trust a separate cold elective site and will be used to increase diagnostic capacity.  30% of the capacity will still be used for private work.
It is used for high-volume and low-complexity work and more than 1,100 two-year NHS waiters were treated at Sulis in 2021/2. Private activity increased from 33% in 2019-20 to 40% in 2021-22.

Performance

By 2010, the rates of hospital acquired MRSA and Clostridium difficile infection were below the national average. In 2010, Dr Foster Hospital Guide reported that RUH mortality rates give no cause for concern.

In 2010, Which? judged that the RUH had the best hospital car parking regime in England.

It was named by the Health Service Journal as one of the top hundred NHS trusts to work for in 2015.  At that time it had 3,852 full time equivalent staff and a sickness absence rate of 3.85%. It was recommend it as a place for treatment by 75% of staff and as a place to work by 68%.

The Consultant Connect service, established at the trust in July 2015, allows GPs to speak directly with a consultant to get specialist advice in real time. It is now widely used across the NHS and has meant that at least 18,500 patients have been spared an outpatient hospital visit.

Maternity services
Maternity services at the RUH were operated under contract, and had not been run by the Royal United Hospital Bath NHS Trust since its foundation in 1992 until 1 June 2014, after the contract had been retendered for three years by the NHS Wiltshire Clinical Commissioning Group. The Great Western Hospitals NHS Foundation Trust had run the service immediately prior to 2014.

Criticism
The trust ran a deficit most years from 1992 to 2009, with very large deficits from 2002 to 2006,
creating an historic debt of £38M by 2008.
It also received a critical Commission for Health Improvement report and zero-star rating in 2002 after a determination of "deliberate manipulation" of waiting lists.
Following this the trust terminated the Chief Executive's contract, but in a subsequent employment tribunal case the former Chief Executive was awarded £218,439 for unfair dismissal with the tribunal rejecting allegations of neglect over misreporting waiting list numbers. Progress has been made since 2006 on a plan to repay historic debt by 2013.
In February 2008, Conservative peer Lord Mancroft made a scathing attack on nursing staff at the hospital, claiming that many nurses who looked after him were "promiscuous, lazy and grubby".

See also
 Healthcare in Somerset
 List of NHS trusts

References

External links

NHS hospital trusts
Organisations based in Bath, Somerset
NHS foundation trusts
Health in Somerset